The American Suburban Carriage was a type of passenger carriage built for the New South Wales Government Railways

History

The American Suburban Carriage were built between 1877 and 1912 by a number of manufacturers with timber frames and truss sided body work. Due to the truss bodywork, it was difficult to cut doors in the sides of the body so doors at either end of the cars were provided with covered platforms to allow access to the carriages. They became the most numerous group of carriages built for any Australian railway system with a total of 659 carriages built. A further 196 carriages, known as Lucy Suburban Carriages were constructed between 1913 and 1916 but had steel under frames and separate bodywork. While they retained the general layout and appearance of the American Suburban Carriage, they were generally not referred to as such and 193 were later completely rebuilt for use in Electric train stock in the 1920s.The American Suburban carriages were built primarily as suburban passenger carriages for the Sydney network. Following the electrification of the Sydney network in the 1920s and 1930s, most carriages were converted for use on longer distance services, whilst others were transferred to Newcastle and Wollongong for continued suburban service or to country branch lines. The last examples were withdrawn in the mid-1970s.

Preservation
A number of American Suburban carriages have been preserved. Examples are owned by the Canberra Railway Museum, Dorrigo Steam Railway and Museum, Lachlan Valley Railway and NSW Rail Museum.

References

Further reading
 

Railway coaches of New South Wales